Ishgum-Addu or Ishgum-Addad ( iš-gum DIŠKUR), or more probably Ishkun-Dagan ( iš-kun Dda-gan), was a ruler of the city of Mari, northern Mesopotamia, for eight years c. 2135-2127 BCE, after the fall of the Akkadian Empire . He had a son named Apil-kin, according to the Shakkanakku Dynasty List, who ruled after him.

Ishgum-Addu appears in the Shakkanakku Dynasty Lists after Ishtup-Ilum. Besides his mention on the Shakkanakku List, no inscriptions are known of him.

References

22nd-century BC rulers
Kings of Mari
22nd-century BC people